Cilix argenta is a moth in the family Drepanidae. It is found in China.

References

Moths described in 1987
Drepaninae